Bacaniini is a tribe of clown beetles in the family Histeridae. There are about 16 genera and more than 170 described species in Bacaniini.

Genera
These 16 genera belong to the tribe Bacaniini:

 Abraeomorphus Reitter, 1886
 Africanister Gomy, 2010
 Antongilus Gomy, 1969
 Australanius Gomy, 2009
 Bacaniomorphus Mazur, 1989
 Bacanius J. L. LeConte, 1853
 Chaetobacanius Gomy, 1977
 Cyclobacanius G. Müller, 1925
 Degallierister Gomy, 2001
 Geocolus Wenzel, 1944
 Juliettinus Gomy, 2010
 Mullerister Cooman, 1936
 Neobacanius G. Müller, 1925
 Sardulus Patrizi, 1955
 Triballodes Schmidt, 1885
 Troglobacanius Vomero, 1974

References

Further reading

External links

 

Histeridae
Articles created by Qbugbot